The Livingston Range is a mountain range located primarily in Glacier National Park in the U.S. state of Montana, and in the extreme southeastern section of the Canadian province of British Columbia. (While these elevations are not particularly high for North American mountains, they are high compared to the roughly 4,000 foot (1,200 m) elevation of the nearby valleys, making for particularly dramatic peaks.)

See also
 List of mountain ranges in Montana
 Mountains and mountain ranges of Glacier National Park (U.S.)

Notes

External links
 
 

 
Mountain ranges of Montana
Mountain ranges of British Columbia
Landforms of Glacier County, Montana
Glacier National Park (U.S.)
Mountains of Glacier National Park (U.S.)